Morgan was a medieval Bishop-elect of Durham.

Morgan was an illegitimate son of King Henry II of England and Nesta, daughter of Iorwerth ab Owain, Lord of Caerleon.  Nesta was married to Sir Ralph Bloet, who raised Morgan as his son.  The date of his birth is unknown but presumed to be toward the end of King Henry's life.

Morgan was the provost of Beverley before being nominated to the see of Durham between 7 March and 7 May 1215. He was never consecrated because Pope Innocent III refused consecration on the grounds of his illegitimacy.  Innocent offered to confirm the election and allow the episcopal consecration if Morgan would swear that he was the son of Nesta and her husband Ralph and not King Henry.  Morgan, after deliberation, replied that it was unthinkable for him to deny his father the king.

After his accession to the throne of England, John, Morgan's half-brother, was known to be generous to the entire Bloet family.

Citations

References

 
 

Bishops of Durham
13th-century English Roman Catholic bishops
Archdeacons of Richmond
Illegitimate children of Henry II of England
Sons of kings